Volodymyr Fedoriv (born on 29 July 1985) is a professional Ukrainian football defender.

Career
He previously played for Sevastopol, Karpaty Lviv. His brother Vitaliy Fedoriv is also a football player.

References

External links
Profile on the Karpaty Lviv Official Website 

1985 births
Living people
Ukrainian footballers
FC Karpaty Lviv players
FC Karpaty-2 Lviv players
FC Chornomorets Odesa players
Ukrainian expatriate footballers
Expatriate footballers in Russia
Ukrainian expatriate sportspeople in Russia
FC Sevastopol players
FC Yenisey Krasnoyarsk players
Expatriate footballers in Poland
Ukrainian expatriate sportspeople in Poland
FC Rukh Lviv players
Association football defenders
Wisła Puławy players